Jara  is a neighbourhood (barrio) of Asunción, Paraguay.

External links

Neighbourhoods of Asunción